The 2004 women's Olympic volleyball tournament was the eleventh edition of the event, organised by the world's governing body, the FIVB in conjunction with the International Olympic Committee. It was held at the Peace and Friendship Stadium located at the Faliro Coastal Zone Olympic Complex between 14 and 28 August 2004.

The medals for the competition were presented by Henri Sérandour, France; Timothy Fok Tsun-ting, Hong Kong; and Els van Breda Vriesman, Netherlands; IOC Members, and the medalists' bouquets were presented by Jizhong Wei, People's Republic of China; FIVB 1st Vice-President, Cristobal Marte Hoffiz, Dominican Republic; FIVB Vice President, and Aleksandar Boričić, Serbia and Montenegro; FIVB Board-Administration Member.

Qualification

* Dominican Republic is associated at the NORCECA (North America and Caribbean), but entered the South American Qualification as only three South American countries competed at the continental qualification.The country won a second chance after wins the 2003 Pan American Games.

Format
The tournament was played in two different stages. A single round-robin format was played within each pool to determine the teams position in the pool.

The  was played in a single elimination format, starting at the quarterfinals, winners advanced to the semifinals while losers were eliminated (ranked at standings as joined 5th).

Pools composition

Rosters

Venue

Preliminary round
 All times are Eastern European Summer Time (UTC+3:00).

Pool A

Pool B

Final round

Quarterfinals

Semifinals

Bronze medal match

Gold medal match

Final standings

Medalists

Awards

Most Valuable Player
 

Best Scorer
 

Best Spiker
 

Best Blocker
 

Best Server
 
Best Digger
 

Best Setter
 

Best Receiver

References

External links
Official 2004 Olympic Games Volleyball website at FIVB
Official results (pgs. 1–60)
Results

O
Volleyball at the 2004 Summer Olympics
Volleyball at the 2004
2004 in Greek women's sport
Women's events at the 2004 Summer Olympics